Wiklöf Holding Arena (located in Idrottsparken) is a multi-purpose stadium in Mariehamn, Finland.  It is used mostly for football matches and is the home ground of IFK Mariehamn and Åland United.  The stadium has a capacity of 1,635 seats, with standing places increasing the total capacity up to 4,500. The first stadium was built in 1932.

Football venues in Finland
Multi-purpose stadiums in Finland
Buildings and structures in Åland
1932 establishments in Finland
Sports venues completed in 1932